Charles Brown (1884 – 22 December 1940) was a British Labour Party politician.

Born in Cromford in Derbyshire, Brown became a hosiery worker in Sutton-in-Ashfield.  He was involved in the labour movement, as an educational organiser for the National Council of Labour Colleges.  In 1925, he was elected to Sutton-in-Ashfield Urban District Council, and in 1928 also to Nottinghamshire County Council.

Brown was elected at the 1929 general election as Member of Parliament (MP) for Mansfield in Nottinghamshire, and held the seat until his death in 1940, at the age of 56.

References

External links 

1884 births
1940 deaths
Councillors in Nottinghamshire
Labour Party (UK) MPs for English constituencies
People from Cromford
UK MPs 1929–1931
UK MPs 1931–1935
UK MPs 1935–1945